Communist Korea may refer to:

 Communism in Korea
 Soviet Civil Administration
 Provisional People's Committee for North Korea
 Democratic People's Republic of Korea, commonly known as "North Korea"
 People's Republic of Korea
 Communist Party of Korea
 Workers' Party of Korea
 Workers' Party of North Korea
 Workers' Party of South Korea
 History of North Korea